Kongsberg School of Mines was an academic institution for mining technology in Kongsberg, Norway from 1757 to 1814.

History
At the 1769 Census, Kongsberg was the second largest city in Norway (after Bergen), with more than 8,000 inhabitants, and the number of employees at the Kongsberg Silver Mines exceeded 4,000.

In 1757, after an initiative from mining engineer Michael Heltzen and chemist and physician Johan Heinrich Becker, Det Kongelige Norske Berg-Seminarium was established by an Order in Council from Frederick V of Denmark dated 19 September 1757. The institution combined both practical and theoretical education related to mining. Among the theoretical subjects were mathematics (in particular geometry and trigonometry), mechanics (for construction of buildings and machinery), hydrostatics, hydraulics, physical chemistry, mineralogy, metallurgy and pyrotechnics. The new school building from 1783 has been preserved. The institution had a library of about 900 books on mining, mineralogy, chemistry, physics and mathematics.

The mining curricula were eventually transferred to Christiania, after the Universitas Regia Fredericiana was established (1811–). After the establishment of the Norwegian Institute of Technology in the 1910s, the education of mining engineers was further moved to Trondheim.

Notable alumni
Erik Otto Knoph
Jens Esmark
Peter Petersen
Paul Steenstrup

Notable faculty
Johan Heinrich Becker
Peter Ascanius
Peter Thorstensen
Olav Olavsen

References

1757 establishments in Norway
Educational institutions established in 1757
19th-century disestablishments in Norway
Kongsberg
Defunct universities and colleges in Norway